Sinod Kumar Shakya is an Indian politician and a member of the Sixteenth Legislative Assembly of Uttar Pradesh in India. He represents the Dataganj constituency of Uttar Pradesh and is a member of the Bhartiya Janta Party political party.

Early life and  education
Sinod Kumar Shakya was born in Budaun district. He is educated till twelfth grade (alma mater not known).

Political career
Sinod Kumar Shakya has been a MLA for two terms. He represented the Dataganj constituency and is a member of the Bahujan Samaj Party political party.

He lost his seat in the 2017 Uttar Pradesh Assembly election to Rajeev Kumar Singh of the Bharatiya Janata Party by huge margin of 25,759 votes.

Posts held

See also
 Dataganj (Assembly constituency)
 Sixteenth Legislative Assembly of Uttar Pradesh
 Uttar Pradesh Legislative Assembly

References 

Bahujan Samaj Party politicians from Uttar Pradesh
Uttar Pradesh MLAs 2007–2012
Uttar Pradesh MLAs 2012–2017
People from Budaun district
1976 births
Living people